Prasat Sikhoraphum is a Khmer temple located in Thailand, located between the cities of Surin and Sisaket. It was built in the 12th century by King Suryavarman II for Hindu worship.

The temple is composed of five sandstone and brick towers, on a base made of laterite. There are sandstone bas-reliefs on the main tower depicting Shiva, Brahma, Ganesha, Vishnu and Uma. The door frames have sets of apsaras, devatas and dvarapalas. The temple was converted for use by Buddhists in the 16th century. Architectural contributions influenced by Laos are evident on the tower roofs. The name comes from the Sanskrit word  of South India shikhara, meaning tower sanctuary.

Gallery

References

Michael Freeman, A guide to Khmer temples in Thailand & Laos, Rivers Books, 1996 
Michael Freeman, Palaces of the Gods: Khmer Art & Architecture in Thailand, River Books, 2001 
Yoshiaki Ishizawa, Along The Royal Roads To Angkor, Weatherhill, 1999 
Claude Jacques and Philippe Lafond, The Khmer Empire, River Books, 2007 
Vittorio Roveda, Images of the gods: khmer mythology in Cambodia, Thailand and Laos, River Books, 2005 
Betty Gosling, Origins of thai art, River Books, 2004 
Carte animée de l'empire khmer de 100 à 1500 AD

External links

Angkorian sites in Thailand
Buildings and structures in Surin province